Franz Fichta (18 November 1892 – 26 August 1967) was an Austrian footballer. He played in one match for the Austria national football team in 1917.

References

External links
 

1892 births
1967 deaths
Austrian footballers
Austria international footballers
Place of birth missing
Association footballers not categorized by position